Keep It Turned On is the fifth studio album by English singer Rick Astley, as well as the first after an eight-year hiatus of his career. It was released in Germany on 3 December 2001. The album reached number 56 on the German Albums Chart. It was his first studio album since 1993's Body & Soul following a long hiatus from music.

Because the album was not released in the UK, "Sleeping" and "Full of You" have appeared on several of his compilation albums, as 'new' tracks.

Track listing 
 "Sleeping" (Astley, Chris Braide) – 3:42
 "Wanna Believe You" (Astley) – 3:44
 "What You See Is What You Don't Get" (Astley, Braide) – 3:24
 "Breathe" (Astley, Bob Dipero) – 3:59
 "One Night Stand" (Astley, Braide) – 4:08
 "Don't Ask" (Astley, Braide) – 4:14
 "Keep It Turned On" (Astley, Braide) – 3:48
 "Romeo Loves Juliet" (Astley) – 3:41
 "Let's Go Out Tonight" (Astley, Braide) – 3:44
 "Full of You" (Astley) – 4:27
 "Miracle" (Astley, Andrew Frampton) – 4:20

Personnel 
 Rick Astley – lead and backing vocals, keyboards, programming, guitars 
 Chris Braide – keyboards, acoustic piano, programming, guitars, backing vocals 
 Richard Cottle – keyboards 
 Ernie McKone – keyboards, programming, bass 
 Ben Robbins – keyboards, programming
 Dave West – keyboards, programming
 Wayne Wilkins – keyboards, programming
 Greg Bone – guitars 
 Anthony Clark – guitars 
 Mark Jaimes – guitars, bass 
 Anthony King – guitars 
 Simon Hill – drums 
 Beverley Skeete – backing vocals

References

2001 albums
Rick Astley albums
Polydor Records albums